Watershed district may refer to:
Watershed district (Minnesota)
Watershed district (Russia)